Wetlands of Bogotá, Colombia are important areas of the capital city, and their development has become increasingly important for the area north of the Andes. A reserve for fauna and flora, the wetlands provide for the preservation and reproduction of a wide variety of mammals, reptiles and birds. These include more than 95 species of migratory birds, as well as many endemic plant species. The wetlands are part of the Bogotá River basin. The wetland complex has been designated as a protected Ramsar site since 2018.

Three types of wetland ecosystems have been identified in the district, differentiated by origin and position: plain wetlands are located in urban areas, while hillside and wasteland wetlands have been identified in the capital's rural areas. Many of the wetland ecosystems are disappearing because of advanced population growth within the city of Bogota.

The flightless Colombian grebe, extinct in the 1980s, was restricted to the Wetlands.

Bogotá Water Company 
The development plan "For the Bogotá We Want" and the Land Use Plan, Plan de Ordenamiento Territorial known by the acronym POT, has designated Empresa de Acueducto de Bogotá (EAB; Bogota Water Company) as the entity in charge of rescuing and restoring Bogota's wetland ecosystems, which are found in a wide state of deterioration.

Wetlands

See also 

 Biodiversity of Colombia
 List of flora and fauna named after the Muisca
 List of flora and fauna of the Eastern Hills, Bogotá

References

Bibliography

External links 

  Fundación Humedales de Bogotá
  Conozca los 15 humedales de Bogotá - El Tiempo

 
Ramsar sites in Colombia